Streptopinna is an Indo-Pacific genus of bivalve molluscs characterized by a roughly triangular outline. There is only one species Streptopinna saccata.

Pinnidae
Taxa named by Eduard von Martens
Bivalve genera
Monotypic mollusc genera